Gheorghe Biță (born 8 September 1963) is a Romanian former footballer who played as a defender and forward.

Honours
Electroputere Craiova
Divizia B: 1990–91, 1998–99
Divizia C: 1984–85
Universitatea Craiova
Cupa României runner-up: 1993–94

Notes

References

1963 births
Living people
Romanian footballers
Romania under-21 international footballers
Association football defenders
Liga I players
Liga II players
Liga III players
FC U Craiova 1948 players
CS Universitatea Craiova players
Espérance Sportive de Tunis players
Tunisian Ligue Professionnelle 1 players
Romanian expatriate footballers
Expatriate footballers in Tunisia
Romanian expatriate sportspeople in Tunisia
Romanian football managers